{{Infobox person
| name            = Maxine Doyle
| image           = Maxine Doyle NMM1234.jpg
| imagesize       = 
| alt             = 
| caption         = Maxine Doyle in New Movie Magazine in 1934
| birth_name      = 
| birth_date      = 
| birth_place     = San Francisco, California, U.S.
| death_date      =  
| death_place     = Los Angeles, California, U.S.
| othername       = 
| occupation      = Actress
| yearsactive     = 1933-1973
| spouse          = William Witney (m.1938-1973; her death)
| domesticpartner = 
| website         = 
}}

Maxine Doyle (January 1, 1915 — May 7, 1973) was an American film actress who appeared in almost 40 films between 1933 and 1946. Today's audiences may know Maxine Doyle from her appearance in the Leon Errol musical short Service with a Smile (1934), one of the very first films in full Technicolor, recently restored and revived by Warner Bros.

Career
By 1928, the 13-year-old Maxine Doyle was singing on radio station KYA in San Francisco, California. A contemporary newspaper article described her as "the sweetheart of KYA".

She was a featured player at Warner Bros., in such films as Babbitt (1934) with Aline MacMahon and Guy Kibbee, and 6 Day Bike Rider (1934) with Joe E. Brown.

Warners dropped her option after one year, and she began freelancing. She was soon hired to play ingenues at Republic, and met director William Witney while filming the serial film S.O.S. Coast Guard (1937). They married in 1938 and had one child.

She retired from the screen until 1943, when Witney needed an actress to play a minor role in his serial G-Men vs. the Black Dragon. Doyle played a nurse (and received high billing). This reactivated her career, and she continued to play incidental roles in Republic films for the next few years. Her last film was the serial Daughter of Don Q'', released in 1946.

Death
Known privately as Maxine Doyle Witney, she died at age 58 from complications from cancer.

Filmography

References

External links

Maxine Doyle's web page

1915 births
1973 deaths
Actresses from Los Angeles
American film actresses
Deaths from cancer in California
Actresses from San Francisco
Burials at Forest Lawn Memorial Park (Glendale)
20th-century American actresses